The 2006 European Track Championships were the European Championships for track cycling, for junior and under 23 riders. They took place in Athens, Greece from 19 – 23 July 2006.

Medal summary

Under 23

Juniors

Open

Omnium

Omnium sprint

Medal Table

References

European Track Championships, 2006
European Track Championships